Buade Lake is a freshwater body of the unorganized territory of Lac-Ashuapmushuan, Quebec, in the western part of the Regional County Municipality (MRC) Le Domaine-du-Roy, in the administrative region of Saguenay-Lac-Saint-Jean, in the province of Quebec, in Canada . This lake straddles the townships of Buade and Poutrincourt. It is located west of the Ashuapmushuan Wildlife Reserve.

Forestry is the main economic activity of the sector. Recreational tourism activities come second.

The western portion of the Buade Lake hydrographic slope is accessible via the R1032 forest road (North-South direction) which passes through the Ventadour River valley, on the west side. The forest road route 167 passes northeast of Nicabau Lake, connecting Chibougamau to Saint-Félicien, Quebec; a secondary road is detached to serve the east side of Poutrincourt Lake. The Canadian National Railway runs along route 167.

The surface of Buade Lake is usually frozen from early November to mid-May, however, safe ice movement is generally from mid-November to mid-April.

Geography

Toponymy
In the old days, Buade Lake was designated "Kapikitegoitch Lake".

The toponym "Lake Buade" was made official on December 5, 1968 by the Commission de toponymie du Québec.

Notes and references

See also 

Lakes of Saguenay–Lac-Saint-Jean
Le Domaine-du-Roy Regional County Municipality